Inkscape is a free and open-source vector graphics editor used to create vector images, primarily in the Scalable Vector Graphics (SVG) format. Other formats can be imported and exported. 

Inkscape can render primitive vector shapes (e.g. rectangles, ellipses, polygons, arcs, spirals, stars and 3D boxes) and text. These objects may be filled with solid colors, patterns, radial or linear color gradients and their borders may be stroked, both with adjustable transparency. Embedding and optional tracing of raster graphics is also supported, enabling the editor to create vector graphics from photos and other raster sources. Created shapes can be further manipulated with transformations, such as moving, rotating, scaling and skewing.

History
Inkscape began in 2003 as a code fork of the Sodipodi project. Sodipodi, developed since 1999, was itself based on Raph Levien's Gill (GNOME Illustration Application). One of the main priorities of the Inkscape project was interface consistency and usability by following the GNOME human interface guidelines.

Four former Sodipodi developers (Ted Gould, Bryce Harrington, Nathan Hurst, and MenTaLguY) led the fork, citing differences over project objectives, openness to third-party contributions, and technical disagreements. They said that Inkscape would focus development on implementing the complete SVG standard, whereas Sodipodi development emphasized developing a general-purpose vector graphics editor, possibly at the expense of SVG.

Following the fork, Inkscape's developers changed the programming language from C to C++; adopted the GTK (formerly GIMP Toolkit) toolkit C++ bindings (gtkmm); redesigned its user interface, and added a number of new features.  Inkscape's implementation of the SVG standard, although incomplete, has shown gradual improvement.

Since 2005, Inkscape has participated in the Google Summer of Code program.

Up until the end of November 2007, Inkscape's source code repository was hosted by SourceForge. Thereafter it moved to Launchpad. In June 2017, it moved to GitLab.

Features

Object creation

Inkscape workflow is based around vector objects. Tools allow manipulating primitive vector shapes: simple ones like rectangles, ellipses and arcs, as well as more complex objects like 3D boxes with adjustable perspectives, stars, polygons and spirals. Rendering feature that can create objects like barcodes, calendars, grids, gears and roulette curves (using the spirograph tool). These objects may be filled with solid colors, patterns, radial or linear color gradients and their borders may be stroked, both with adjustable transparency. All of those can be further edited by transformations—such as moving, rotating, scaling and skewing—or by editing paths.

Other tools allow creating Bézier curves, freehand drawing of lines (pencil), or calligraphic (brush-like) strokes which support a graphics tablet.

Inkscape is able to write and edit text with tools available for changing font, spacing, kerning, rotation, flowing along the path or into a shape. Text can be converted to paths for further editing. The program also has a layers (as well as an objects) feature that allows the user to organize objects in a preferred stacking order in the canvas. Objects can be made visible/invisible and locked/unlocked through these features.

Symbol libraries enable Inkscape to use existing symbols like logic-gate symbols or DOT pictograms. Additional libraries can be included by the user.

Inkscape supports image tracing, the process of extracting vector graphics from raster sources.

Clones are child objects of an original parent object. Different transformations can be applied to them, such as: size, position, rotation, blur, opacity, color and symmetry. Clones are updated live whenever the parent object changes.

Object manipulation
Every object in the drawing can be subjected to arbitrary affine transformations: moving, rotating, scaling, skewing and a configurable matrix. Transformation parameters can be specified numerically. Transformations can snap to angles, grids, guidelines and nodes of other objects, or be aligned in specified direction, spaced equally, scattered at random.

Objects can be grouped together. Groups of objects behave similarly to objects. Objects in a group can be edited without having to ungroup them first.

The Z-order determines the order in which objects are drawn on the canvas. Objects with a high Z-order are drawn on top of objects lower in the Z-order. Order of objects can be managed either using layers, or by manually moving the object up and down in the Z-order. Layers can be locked or hidden, preventing modifying and accidental selection.

The Create Tiled Clones tool allows symmetrical or grid-like drawings using various plane symmetries.

Appearance of objects can be further changed by using masks and clipping paths, which can be created from arbitrary objects, including groups.

The style attributes are 'attached' to the source object, so after cutting/copying an object onto the clipboard, the style's attributes can be pasted to another object.

Objects can also be moved by manually entering the location coordinates in the top toolbar. Even additions and subtractions can be done this way.

Operations on paths

Inkscape has a comprehensive tool set to edit paths (as they are the basic element of a vector file):
 Edit Path by Node tool: allows for the editing of single or multiple paths and or their associated node(s). There are four types of path nodes; Cusp (corner), Smooth, Symmetric and Auto-Smooth. Editing is available for the positioning of nodes and their associated handles (angle and length) for Linear and Bézier paths or Spiro curves. A path segment can also be adjusted by dragging (left click + hold). When multiple nodes are selected, they can be moved, scaled and rotated using keyboard shortcut or mouse controls. Additional nodes can be inserted into paths at arbitrary or even placements, and an effect can be used to insert nodes at predefined intervals. When nodes are deleted, the handles on remaining ones are adjusted to preserve the original shape as closely as possible.
 Tweak tool (sculpting/painting): provides whole object(s) or node editing regions (parts) of an object. It can push, repel/attract, randomize positioning, shrink/enlarge, rotate, copy/delete selected whole objects. With parts of a path you can push, shrink/enlarge, repel/attract, roughen edges, blur and color. Nodes are dynamically created and deleted when needed while using this tool, so it can also be used on simple paths without pre-processing.
 Path-Offsets; Outset, Inset, Linked or Dynamic: can create a Linked or Dynamic (unlinked) Inset and or an Outset of an existing path which can then be fine tuned using the given Shape or Node tool. Creating a Linked Offset of a path will update whenever the original is modified. Making symmetrical (i.e., picture frame) graphics easier to edit.
 Path-Conversion; Object to Path: conversions of Objects; Shapes (square, circle, etc.) or Text into paths.
 Path-Conversion; Stroke to Path: conversions of the Stroke of a shape to a path.
 Path-Simplify: a given path's node count will reduce while preserving the shape.
 Path-Operations (boolean operations): use of multiple objects to Union, Difference, Intersection, Exclusion, Division and Cut Path.

Inkscape includes a feature called Live Path Effects (LPE), which can apply various modifiers to a path. Envelope Deformation is available via the Path Effects and provides a perspective effect. There are more than a dozen of these live path effects. LPE can be stacked onto a single object and have interactive live on canvas and menu-based editing of the effects.

File formats

Inkscape's primary format is SVG 1.1, meaning that it can create and edit with the abilities and within the constraints of this format. Any other format must either be imported (converted to SVG) or exported (converted from SVG). The SVG format is using the Cascading Style Sheets (CSS) standard internally. Inkscape's implementation of SVG and CSS standards is incomplete. Most notably, it does not support animation natively. Inkscape has multilingual support, particularly for complex scripts. Formats that used the UniConvertor library are not supported beyond the 1.0 release. A workaround is to have a parallel installation of version 0.92.x.

Other features
 XML Editor for direct manipulation of the SVG XML structure
 Support for SVG filter effects
 Editing of Resource Description Framework (RDF), a World Wide Web Consortium (W3C) metadata information model
 Command-line interface, exposes format conversion functions and full-featured GUI scripting
 More than sixty interface languages
 Extensible to new file formats, effects and other features
 Mathematical diagramming, with various uses of LaTeX
 Experimental support for scripting
 lib2Geom is now also external usable. 2Geom is a computational geometry library, originally developed for Inkscape. While developed for Inkscape it is a library that can be used from any application. It provides support for basic geometric algebra, paths, distortions, boolean operations, plotting implicit functions, non-uniform rational B-spline (NURBS) and more. 2Geom is free software released under LGPL 2.1 or MPL 1.1.

Platform support
The latest version of Inkscape 1.0.x (and older line 0.92.x) is available for Linux, Windows 7+, and macOS 10.11-10.15 platforms. Inkscape is packaged with AppImage, Flatpak, PPA, Snap and source by all major Linux distributions (including Debian, Ubuntu, Fedora, OpenSUSE) with GTK+ 3.24+ (0.92.x with GTK+ 2.20+ for older Linux).

, Wacom tablet support for GTK 3 is in a reviving project. Version 1.0.x includes GTK 3 and Wacom support depending necessary Wacom Linux or Unix driver.

Release history

Reception
In Jan. 2020, TechRadar gave Inkscape a positive rating of four stars out of five. It lauded the wide range of editing tools and support for many file formats, but noted that the application's processing can be slow. It considered Inkscape to be a good free alternative to proprietary graphics editors such as Adobe Illustrator. PC Magazines review was rather mixed, giving the application three out of five. It criticized the interface's graphics and lack of optimization for stylus support, the application's poor interoperability with other graphics editors, unwieldy text formatting controls, and the quality of the Mac version. However, it did praise the ability to add custom filters and extensions, the Inkscape community's passion for creating and sharing them, and the precise path and placement tools. It found Inkscape to have limited uses in profession compared to Adobe Illustrator and CorelDRAW. In its 2012 Best of Open Source Software Awards, InfoWorld gave Inkscape an award for being one of the best open-source desktop applications, commending its typographic controls and ability to directly edit the XML text of its documents.

Gallery

See also

 AutoCAD
 Comparison of vector graphics editors
 Create Project
 Libre Graphics Meeting
List of free and open source software packages
 Open Clip Art Library
 Open Font Library
Wikipedia tutorial: How to draw a diagram with Inkscape

References

Further reading

External links

 

 Inkscape Keyboard Layout - on Open Clipart
 learning materials for Inkscape
 free Inkscape manual 2015
 Floss Manuals

2003 software
Cross-platform free software
Free and open-source software
Free diagramming software
Free graphics software
Free multilingual software
Free software programmed in C++
Free vector graphics editors
Google events
Graphics software that uses GTK
MacOS graphics-related software
Portable software
Raster to vector conversion software
Scalable Vector Graphics
Software forks
Software that uses Cairo (graphics)
Vector graphics editors for Linux
Windows graphics-related software
Software that was rewritten in C++